Jackie Shako Diala Anahengo (23 August 1958 – 15 June 2021) was a Congolese actress. She appeared on Radio-Télévision nationale congolaise, as well as on the theatrical stage.

References

1958 births
2021 deaths
People from Sankuru
Democratic Republic of the Congo actresses
21st-century Democratic Republic of the Congo people